Tacoma is an unincorporated community in Belmont County, in the U.S. state of Ohio.

History
A post office called Tacoma was established in 1887, and remained in operation until 1963. Besides the post office, Tacoma had the Belmont County Children's Home for indigent children.

References

Unincorporated communities in Belmont County, Ohio
1887 establishments in Ohio
Populated places established in 1887
Unincorporated communities in Ohio